Peter Zimmermann (born 1956 in Freiburg im Breisgau) is a German painter, sculptor, object artist and university professor.

Life and education 
Peter Zimmermann studied at the State Academy of Fine Arts in Stuttgart from 1978 to 1983. Since then he has taken part in numerous solo and group exhibitions in galleries and museums both within Germany and abroad. He works as a painter, sculptor and object artist. He was a professor at the Academy of Media Arts Cologne between 2002 and 2007.

Work 
Zimmermann's work is extremely diverse. At the end of the 1980s he created his "Book Cover Paintings," in which the covers and titles of atlases, art books, travel guides and dictionaries were represented on canvas using epoxy. Through his cardboard objects he works with the spatial distortion of the written word and thus questions the relationship between text and image. The colourful motives in his epoxy resin images arise from digital templates, such as photos, film stills or diagrams, which he distorts by means of graphical algorithms and transfers onto the canvas in numerous transparent layers of epoxy resin. Since 2014 he has increasingly realised this conceptual approach through the medium of oil painting.
Questions concerning the relationship between the original and its depiction as well as an engagement with the concept of the surface lie at the centre of his creative output.
Zimmermann's work is to be found in numerous private and public collections, for example the Bundeskunstsammlung in Bonn, Centre Georges Pompidou in Paris and the Museum of Modern Art in New York. The artist lives and works in Cologne.

Exhibitions

solo exhibitions (selection) 
 2016: Museum für neue Kunst, Freiburg, Germany
 2016: Museum gegenstandsfeier Kunst, Otterndorf, Germany
 2015: CMYK, dirimart Gallery Istanbul, Turkey
 2015: Nunu Fine Arts, Taipei, Taiwan
 2014: sur le motif, Gallery Perrotin, Paris, France
 2013: Undertones, Wasserman Projects, Detroit, United States of America
 2013: Johyun Gallery Busan, Korea
 2013: crystal & fruits, Gallery Michael Janssen, Singapore
 2012: Galeria Filomena Soares, Lisbon, Portugal
 2012: drop, Gallery Perrotin, Hong Kong
 2011: Panorama, Kunstforum and Kunstverein Schwäbisch Hall, Germany
 2009: Museum Moderner Kunst Kärnten, Klagenfurt, Germany
 2008: currents, cma, Columbus Museum of Art, Columbus, Ohio, United States of America
 2007/2008: wheel. Kunsthalle Nürnberg, Germany
 2006: Capas de gelatina / Layers of jelly, Centro de Arte Contemporáneo, Málaga, Spain 
 2004: Before After. Delaware Center of Contemporary Art, Delaware, United States of America
 2003: x-pollination. with Claus Carstensen, Esbjerg Kunstmuseum, Denmark
 2002: Zipp, Kasseler Kunstverein, Kassel, Germany
 2001: Flow, Kunstverein Heilbronn, Germany 
 2001: Kunsthalle Erfurt, Erfurt, Germany
 1998: Eigentlich könnte alles auch anders sein, Kölnischer Kunstverein, Cologne, Germany
 1998: "Kisten & Plakate", Städtische Galerie Donaueschingen, Germany
 1997: Otto-Dix-Haus, Gera, Germany
 1996: "Remixes", Icebox, Athens, Greece
 1996: "Öffentlich / Privat" (with Thomas Locher), Kunstraum der Universität Lüneburg and Künstlerhaus Stuttgart, Germany
 1992: Kunstverein Münster, Germany

group exhibitions (selection) 
 2013: To Open Eyes – Kunst und Textil vom Bauhaus bis heute, Kunsthalle Bielefeld, Germany
 2013: Happy Birthday, Gallery Perrotin / 25 Years, Tripostal, Lille, France
 2012: The slide show, FRAC Auvergne, Clermont-Ferrand, France
 2011: Farbe im Fluß, Weserburg Museum für moderne Kunst, Bremen, Germany 
 2011: Hirschfaktor "Die Kunst des Zitierens" ZKM, Karlsruhe, Germany
 2009: Reloaded, Kunstmuseum Bonn
 2009: Extended, ZKM, Karlsruhe, Germany
 2008: There is Desire left (Knock, knock) Werke aus der Sammlung Mondstudio, Museum Wiesbaden, Germany
 2008: Vetrautes Terrain. Aktuelle Kunst in & über Deutschland – collector's choice, ZKM, Museum für Neue Kunst, Karlsruhe, Germany
 2007: Moscow Biennale
 2006: Wilhelm-Hack-Museum Ludwigshafen, Germany
 2005: Museum der Moderne Salzburg. Rupertinum, Austria
 2003: Württembergischer Kunstverein Stuttgart, Germany
 2003: Morsbroich Museum, Leverkusen, Germany
 2002: Schirn Kunsthalle Frankfurt, Frankfurt/M
 2002: Deichtorhallen, Hamburg, Germany

Public Collections 
 Fonds National d'Art Contemporain, Paris, France
 Fondation Cartier Pour l'Art Contemporain, Paris, France
 Musée d'Art moderne de la Ville de Paris, Paris, France
 Musée d'Art moderne de Saint-Étienne, Saint-Étienne, France
 FRAC Languedoc-Roussillon, France
 Centre Georges Pompidou (Amis du musée national d'Art moderne), France
 FRAC Aquitaine, France
 Filmoteca universitaria de Barcelona, Barcelona, Spain
 Museum of Modern Art, New York, United States of America
 New York Public Library, New York, United States of America
 Bibliothèque Nationale, Paris, France
 New Orleans Museum of Modern Art, New Orleans, United States of America
 Museum für Angewandte Kunst, Cologne, Germany
 Neue Galerie, Graz, Austria
 Museum of Fine Arts, Boston, United States of America
 Galerie für zeitgenössische Kunst, Leipzig, Germany
 Staatsgalerie Stuttgart, Germany
 LB Baden-Württemberg, Germany

Bibliography Publications

Books, Catalogues 
 Museum für Neue Kunst Freiburg: Peter Zimmermann – Schule von Freiburg. (German and English), SNOECK, Freiburg 2016. 
 Galerie Perrotin: Peter Zimmermann. (English and Chinese), Damiani editore, Paris 2013. 
 Andrea Madesta: Peter Zimmermann – Works since 1987 (German, English and French), Snoeck Verlagsgesellschaft mbH, Cologne 2009. 
 Ellen Seifermann (Herausgeber): Peter Zimmermann. wheel. (German and English). Verlag für moderne Kunst, Nürnberg 2007. 
 Hubertus Butin: Peter Zimmermann. Painting. Hatje Cantz, Ostfildern 2007. 
 Peter Zimmermann: Epoxiology. (German, English and French). König, Cologne 2006. 
 Stephan Berg: Peter Zimmermann. capas de gelatina. (English and Spanish). Centro de Arte, Málaga 2006. 
 Jens Schröter: Peter Zimmermann. Kunsthalle Erfurt, Erfurt 2001
 Tom Holert: Peter Zimmermann. Flow. König, Cologne 2001. 
 Peter Zimmermann: Skandal: Kunst. Springer, Vienna and New York 2000. 
 Peter Zimmermann: Eigentlich könnte alles auch anders sein. König, Köln 1998.

Secondary Literature 
 Harald Uhr:: "Painting versus. Plasma Flatscreen – A portrait by Harald Uhr", Artblog Cologne
 Margrit Brehm: The Reflection of Surfaces. Die Reflexion der Oberflächen. La réflexion des surfaces. In: Peter Zimmermann. Epoxiology. Walther Konig, Cologne 2007, 
 Margit Zuckriegl: Peter Zimmermann. Die Gedanken der Bilder. The thoughts of pictures. In: Vom Bild zum Bild. Metamorphose. Museum der Moderne Salzburg. Rupertinum. Salzburg 2005, S. 42–47
 Ralf Christofori: Kopfsprung in den Signalfluß. In: FAZ, 30 August 2001
 Hans-Jürgen August: Erregung kollektiven Lustgefühls. In: Wiener Zeitung, 1 December 2001
 Astrid Wege: Peter Zimmermann. In: Art – Das Kunstmagazin Artis. December 1996
 Franz Kotteder: Heimwerkers Alptraum. In: SZ 7 March 1996

References

External links 
 
 Webpage of the Artist
 Paintings and objekts of Peter Zimmermann
 More paintings of Peter Zimmermann

1956 births
Living people
Artists from Freiburg im Breisgau
German painters
German male painters
German sculptors
German male sculptors
German contemporary artists